The Teotihuacan Priests are a semi-professional ice hockey team in Mexico City, Mexico. They play in the Liga Mexicana Élite.

History
The club founded in 2010, and joined the LME for the 2010-11 season. They finished in third place in the regular season, and were playoff champions by defeating the Aztec Eagle Warriors in the semifinals, and the Mayan Astronomers in the finals. Derek Nachimow scored all three goals for the Priests in the final.

Season-by-Season Results

Honours
Liga Mexicana Élite:
Winners (1): 2018–19

External links
Team profile on hockeymexico.com

Sports teams in Mexico City
Ice hockey teams in Mexico
Ice hockey clubs established in 2010
2010 establishments in Mexico